King Master George is the second studio album by the Japanese dub music band Fishmans, released on October 21, 1992, by the Media Remoras record label.

Track listing
 "いい言葉ちょうだい" - 4:41
 "誰かを捜そう" - 4:30
 "シーフードレストラン" - 2:07
 "影ドロボウ" - 4:53
 "ダイビング" - 1:10
 "ミネラルウォーター" - 3:38
 "なんてったの" - 4:39
 "ハンバーグ" - 0:31
 "１００ミリちょっとの" - 4:46
 "頼りない天使" - 4:36
 "トナカイ" - 5:52
 "君だけがダイヤモンド" - 0:07
 "雨男憎まれる" - 1:46
 "土曜日の夜" - 4:05
 "曲目紹介" - 3:55
 "教育" - 0:09

References

Fishmans albums
1992 albums